Madison County is a county located in the U.S. state of Texas. As of the 2020 census, its population was 13,455. Its seat is Madisonville. The county was created in 1853 and organized the next year. It is named for James Madison, the fourth President of the United States.

History
The current Madison County Courthouse was built in 1970. It is at least the fifth courthouse to serve Madison County.

Geography 

The county has three natural borders;  its eastern boundary is defined by the Trinity River, its western boundary is defined by the Navasota River, and the portion of its southern border adjacent to Walker County is defined by Bedias Creek.

Major highways
  Interstate 45
  U.S. Highway 190
  State Highway 21
  State Highway 75
  State Highway 90
  State Highway OSR

Adjacent counties 
 Leon County (north)
 Houston County (northeast)
 Walker County (southeast)
 Grimes County (south)
 Brazos County (southwest)

Demographics 

Note: the US Census treats Hispanic/Latino as an ethnic category. This table excludes Latinos from the racial categories and assigns them to a separate category. Hispanics/Latinos can be of any race.

As of the census of 2000,  12,940 people, 3,914 households, and 2,837 families were residing in the county.  The population density was 28 people per square mile (11/km2).  The 4,797 housing units averagedensity 10 per mi2 (4/km2).  The racial makeup of the county was 66.79% White, 22.87%  African American, 0.32% Native American, 0.39% Asian, 7.93% from other races, and 1.72% from two or more races.  About 15.78% of the population were Hispanic or Latino of any race.

Of the 3,914 households, 31.50% had children under the age of 18 living with them, 57.10% were married couples living together, 11.70% had a female householder with no husband present, and 27.50% were not families. About 24.50% of all households were made up of individuals, and 12.40% had someone living alone who was 65 years of age or older.  The average household size was 2.57, and the average family size was 3.05.

In the county, the age distribution was 21.10% under 18, 13.00% from 18 to 24, 31.90% from 25 to 44, 20.00% from 45 to 64, and 14.00% who were 65 or older.  The median age was 33 years. For every 100 females there were 142.60 males.  For every 100 females age 18 and over, there were 155.10 males.

The median income for a household in the county was $29,418, and for a family was $35,779. Males had a median income of $25,625 versus $19,777 for females. The per capita income for the county was $14,056.  About 12.30% of families and 15.80% of the population were below the poverty line, including 20.00% of those under age 18 and 16.30% of those age 65 or over.

Government and infrastructure
The Ferguson Unit, a Texas Department of Criminal Justice prison for men, is located in an unincorporated area in the county.

Politics

Communities

Cities
 Madisonville (county seat)
 Midway

Town
 Normangee (mostly in Leon County)

Unincorporated community
 North Zulch

Education
School districts:
 Madisonville Consolidated Independent School District
 Normangee Independent School District
 North Zulch Independent School District

Blinn College is the designated community college for all of the county.

See also

 National Register of Historic Places listings in Madison County, Texas
 Recorded Texas Historic Landmarks in Madison County

References

External links 
 Madison County government's website
 

 
Populated places established in 1854
1854 establishments in Texas